Youcef Atal (born 17 May 1996) is an Algerian professional footballer who plays for Ligue 1 club Nice and the Algeria national team. He mainly plays as a right-back, but can also play as a left winger.

Club career
Atal joined French club Nice from Paradou AC in 2018. He underwent knee surgery in December 2019.

International career
On 1 June 2017, Atal was called up to the Algeria national team for the first time for a friendly match against Guinea and a 2019 Africa Cup of Nations qualifier against Togo.

Career statistics

International

Scores and results list Algeria's goal tally first.

Honours
Paradou AC
 Algerian Ligue Professionnelle 2: 2016–17

Nice
 Coupe de France runner-up: 2021–22

Algeria
 Africa Cup of Nations: 2019

References

External links
 
 

Living people
1996 births
People from Boghni
Association football fullbacks
Association football wingers
Algeria international footballers
Algerian footballers
Algerian Ligue 2 players
Belgian Third Division players
Ligue 1 players
CR Belouizdad players
JS Kabylie players
Kabyle people
Paradou AC players
USM Alger players
K.V. Kortrijk players
OGC Nice players
Algerian expatriate sportspeople in Belgium
Algerian expatriate sportspeople in France
Algerian expatriate footballers
Expatriate footballers in Belgium
Expatriate footballers in France
2019 Africa Cup of Nations players
21st-century Algerian people
2021 Africa Cup of Nations players